Acalyptris basihastatus is a moth of the family Nepticulidae. It is found in the Amazon premontane rainforest in Ecuador.

The wingspan is 4.3–4.6 mm for males. Adults have been collected in late January.

External links
New Neotropical Nepticulidae (Lepidoptera) from the western Amazonian rainforest and the Andes of Ecuador

Nepticulidae
Endemic fauna of Ecuador
Moths of South America
Moths described in 2002